Luiz Ricardo da Silva (born 12 November 1984), commonly known as Zelão, is a Brazilian former professional footballer who played as a centre back.

Career
Zelão scored his first goal in the Campeonato Brasileiro against Santos on 3 June 2007 in a 1–1 draw.

On 31 January 2011, Zelão signed a four-year contract with FC Kuban Krasnodar. After two seasons with Kuban, Zelão left on 23 January 2013, and a week later signed for Kazakhstan Premier League side FC Astana.

In November 2014, Zelão was linked with a move to Guarani, but went on to sign for XV de Piracicaba in December.

Career statistics

Honours 
Astana
 Kazakhstan Super Cup: Runner-up 2013

Notes

References

External links
  CBF
  zerozero.pt
  placar

1984 births
Living people
Brazilian footballers
Esporte Clube Noroeste players
Clube Atlético Bragantino players
Sport Club Corinthians Paulista players
FC Saturn Ramenskoye players
FC Kuban Krasnodar players
Sociedade Esportiva Matonense players
FC Astana players
Russian Premier League players
Kazakhstan Premier League players
Brazilian expatriate footballers
Expatriate footballers in Russia
Expatriate footballers in Kazakhstan
Footballers from São Paulo (state)
Association football defenders